Frans Cools (17 February 1918 – 3 September 1999) was a Belgian cyclist. He competed in three events at the 1936 Summer Olympics.

References

External links
 

1918 births
1999 deaths
Belgian male cyclists
Olympic cyclists of Belgium
Cyclists at the 1936 Summer Olympics
Cyclists from Greater London